Nicholas James "Nick" Ponzio (born 4 January 1995) is an American-born Italian shot putter. He competed at the 2020 Summer Olympics, in Shot put.

Biography 
Nick Ponzio obtained Italian citizenship on June 15 and the process for the recognition of eligibility to wear the azzurro jersey, at 27 June 2021, day after he won his first Italian national title was underway. On 29 June 2021, World Athletics gave him clearance from 15 June to qualify him for 2020 Olympics

Personal bests 
 Shot put: 21.83 m (Leiria, Portugal 13 March 2022)

Achievements

National titles 
Ponzio won three national championship at individual senior level.

 Italian Athletics Championships
 Shot put: 2021, 2022

 Italian Athletics Indoor Championships
 Shot put: 2022

Notes

References

External links 
 

1995 births
Italian male shot putters
Living people
Track and field athletes from San Diego
Athletes (track and field) at the 2020 Summer Olympics
Olympic athletes of Italy
USC Trojans men's track and field athletes